Tim Harding may refer to:
Tim Harding (musician) (born 1978), Australian musician and entertainer
Tim Harding (chess player) (born 1948), chess author, player and historian

See also
Tim Hardin (1941–1980), American musician and composer